Films produced in Sri Lanka in the 1980s.

1980

1981

1982

1983

1984

1985

1986

1987

1988

1989

See also
 Cinema of Sri Lanka
 List of Sri Lankan films

1980s
Films
Sri Lanka